Following is a list of senators of French India, people who have represented the colony of French India in the Senate of France.
Officially called the Établissements français dans l'Inde, the colony consisted of five small enclaves, of which Pondicherry was the largest.

Third Republic

Senators for French India under the French Third Republic were:

 Pierre Desbassyns de Richemont (36 March 1876–1882)
 Jacques Hébrard (8 January 1882–1891)
 Jules Godin (11 January 1891–1909)
 Étienne Flandin (7 January1909–1922) died in office
 Henri Gaebelé (9 March 1922–1924) resigned
 Paul Bluysen (9 December 1924–1928) died in office
 Docteur Eugène Le Moignic (1928–1944)

Fourth Republic

Senators for French India under the French Fourth Republic were:

 Maurice Paquirissamypoullé (1947–1955)
 Caïlacha Subbiah (1947–1948)

References

Sources

 
Lists of members of the Senate (France) by department